Wolf Girl (also known as Blood Moon) is a 2001 made-for-television horror film directed by Thom Fitzgerald and written by Lori Lansens. An international co-production of Canada and Romania, it stars Tim Curry, Victoria Sanchez, Grace Jones, and Lesley Ann Warren. The film's plot concerns a girl who travels with a freak show because of her rare genetic disorder known as hypertrichosis.

Plot
Born into a financially suffering traveling freak show circus, Tara works as the show's "Wolf Girl" due to her hypertrichosis. She is well loved by her fellow circus people, but is frequently ostracized by the local teens at the towns they visit. At their latest town she runs afoul of the town bullies but meets Ryan, a teenage boy whose mother is working on an experimental depilatory treatment. He helps Tara obtain the drug by stealing it from his mother's lab. Tara experiences favorable hair loss, but also begins to have strange dreams and exhibit feral-like behaviors. This is noticed by her fellow performers, however they keep quiet because the circus has become more financially stable after its host Harley notices that the town enjoys the more frightening aspects of the show. One of the town bullies, Beau, tries to kill Tara after she accidentally discovers that he has a micropenis. She kills him in self-defense and his body is discovered by the town.

Tara is forced to steal doses of the drug after Ryan tells her that he cannot obtain any more without his mother noticing. Later that night, under the influence of the drug, Tara attacks Harley during the show. Correctly assuming that she is responsible for Beau's death, the town forms a lynch mob. Fleeing into the forest, Tara sheds her clothes and attacks one of her bullies, Krystal, by ripping out her tongue. They are found by Ryan, whose attempts at soothing Tara are foiled when she sees that he is carrying a gun. She implores him to shoot her with the last of her fading humanity, but he refuses. A wolf appears and the film cuts away as a shot is fired. The circus is then shown leaving the town without Tara. It is also revealed that Ryan shot the wolf and turned in its corpse, which satisfies the townspeople as they believed that she was a true werewolf. The film ends showing that Tara is still alive and now no longer suffers from hypertrichosis, but at the cost of her humanity.

Cast

Production 
Filming for Wolf Girl took place in Romania. Tim Curry was brought on to portray the circus's ringleader Harley and Grace Jones was cast as one of the show's freaks.

Release 
Wolf Girl premiered on USA on October 16, 2001, after which it was released direct to video. It was released in Canada under the title Blood Moon.

Reception 
Critical reception has been mostly positive. John Leonard of New York Magazine called the film "Vulgar fun." IGN praised Wolf Girl for its acting and look, while also criticizing it for its "underdeveloped characters and spotty transition".

See also
 Fedor Jeftichew

References

Bibliography

External links
 

2001 films
2001 horror films
2001 television films
2000s English-language films
English-language Canadian films
English-language Romanian films
Canadian werewolf films
Canadian horror television films
Romanian horror films
Circus films
Films about disability
Films about sideshow performers
Films directed by Thom Fitzgerald
The Kushner-Locke Company films
2000s Canadian films